Parapopanoceras is a ceratitid ammonite with a small, smooth, very involute and moderately globose shell that lived during the middle Triassic.

Parapopanoceras normally has 6 to 7 whorls in its phragmocone, seldom as much as nine, with a body chamber 1-1.5 whorls in length.  The suture is ceratitic with phylloid (leaf-like) saddles and subdivided lobes.  The siphuncle begins at a central or subcentral position and in most species becomes ventral at the end of the second whorl.  In all species septal nacks are short retrochoanitic (point adapically) in the first whorl, are transitory in the second whorl, and become prochoanitic (point adorally) in the third whorl and thereafter. Closely related Stenopopanoceras differs in that its siphuncle starts off ventral.
 
Parapopanoceras was named by Haug in 1994. The type species is Popanoceras verneuili Mojsisovics 1886.  Related genera include Amphipopanoceras and Stenopopanoceras.

Distribution
Fossils have been found in Svalbard, Jan Mayen, British Columbia, the Russian Federation, and possibly Papua New Guinea.

References
Notes

Bibliography
Vladimir V. Arkadiev  & Mikhail N. Vavilov 1984. Middle Triassic Parapopanoceratidae and Nathorstitidae (Ammonoidea) of Boreal Region: Internal Structure, Ontogeny and Phylogenetic Patterns. Geobios 
Arkell, et al., 1957. Mesozoic Ammonoidea, Treatise on Invertebrate Paleontology Park L, Mollusca 4.  Geological Society of America and University of Kansas Press.

Triassic ammonites
Fossils of Svalbard
Anisian life
Ammonitida